The Ulucanlar Prison Museum is a former state prison in Ankara, Turkey that was converted into a prison museum following restoration by Altındağ Municipality. The museum was opened in 2011. It is the first museum of its kind in Turkey.

Prison

History
Ulucanlar Prison was established in 1925 in the Ulucanlar neighborhood of Altındağ district in Ankara, which had recently become the new capital of the Turkish Republic.

In its history, it was renamed several times and called "Cebeci Tevkifhanesi" (Cebeci Jail), "Cebeci Umumi Hapishanesi" (Cebeci Public Prison), "Cebeci Sivil Cezaevi" (Cebeci Civilian Prison), "Ankara Merkez Kapalı Cezaevi" (Ankara Central Closed Prison) and finally "Ulucanlar Merkez Kapalı Cezaevi" (Ulucanlar Central Closed Prison).

The correction and detention facilities in Turkey are officially categorized in three security level groups as closed, semi-open and open prisons. Closed prisons are maximum security penitentiaries with external and internal control that hold violent prisoners and those judged most likely to escape. Semi-open prisons are medium security correctional institutions without external control but with only internal physical barriers that house prisoners bearing a moderate escape risk who also have a job. Open prisons are low security, work-oriented prison camps with no external control and internal physical barriers that hold inmates who are allowed to have limited interaction with the public. As of September 1999, the mixed-sex prison hosted 776 detainees and prisoners held in nineteen wards in the close and semi-open prison sections. The prison's healthcare facility had a capacity of forty beds.

Several prison riots broke out in July, September and December 1999. Ten inmates died and at least 28 were injured in the September riot while three men's wards and some of the women's wards were destroyed. At this time, an incomplete escape tunnel was discovered.

In 2006, the inmates of the closed prison section were transferred to a newly built prison in Sincan, Ankara. The evacuation of the semi-open prison section took place later.

Notable inmates
During its 81-year existence, Ulucanlar Prison held notable intellectuals with different political views including journalists, poets, and writers, as well as professional politicians alongside political activists and criminals. Among the notable people who were detained or imprisoned (not including executions) were:

 Hüseyin Cahit Yalçın (1875–1957), journalist, writer and politician
 Cevat Şakir Kabaağaçlı (1890–1973), novelist, short-story writer, essayist, ethnographer and travel writer
 Nazım Hikmet Ran (1902–1963) poet, playwright, novelist and memoirist
 Necip Fazıl Kısakürek (1904–1983), poet, novelist, playwright, philosopher and activist
 Kemal Tahir (1910-1973), novelist and scholar
 Osman Bölükbaşı (1913–2002), politician, party leader
 Bülent Ecevit (1925-2006), poet, writer, scholar, and journalist, Prime Minister of Turkey
  (1917–1983), journalist and politician
 Yaşar Kemal (1923-2015), writer and human rights activist
 Metin Toker (1924-2002), journalist and writer
 Bülent Ecevit (1925–2006), poet, writer, journalist, social-democratic politician and four-time prime minister
  (1928-2015), journalist and writer
 Fakir Baykurt (1929-1999), writer and trade unionist
 Fakir Baykurt (1929–1999), educator, writer and labor union leader
 Yılmaz Güney (1937–1984), film director, scenarist, novelist and actor
 Muhsin Yazıcıoğlu (1954–2009), right-wing, nationalist-Islamist politician
 Hatip Dicle (1954- ), Kurdish politician
 Leyla Zana (1961- ), Kurdish politician and activist
 Sırrı Süreyya Önder (born 1962), film director, actor, screenwriter, columnist and politician

The prison was also the site of torture and cruelty as well as many prison riots and executions.

Executions
Nineteen executions took place in the prison yard by hanging. Among the notable inmates sentenced to capital punishment and executed were:
 İskilipli Âtıf Hodja (1875–1926), As an Islamist scholar supported British invasion in local newspaper "Alemdar" that he was publishing
  (1947–1972), Marxist–Leninist revolutionary and political activist (executed)
 Deniz Gezmiş (1947–1972), Marxist–Leninist revolutionary and political activist
  (1949–1972), Marxist–Leninist revolutionary and armed political activist
  (1958–1980), Marxist–Leninist revolutionary and political activist
  (1958–1980), right-wing, nationalist-Islamist activist
 Erdal Eren (1964–1980), Marxist–Leninist revolutionary and political activist (executed)

Museum

Restoration
The prison facility was officially declared a building of historic interest which could not, for that reason, be demolished, extended, or altered without special permission. Altındağ Municipality restored the prison building to its original form and opened it to the public as a museum in July 2011.

Long lasting restoration work that cost around 10 million (US$6.7 million as of 2010) was carried out though no archive was available due to two fires that occurred in the prison building in the past. Documents relating to the 81-year history of the prison were limited to photographs from 1997 and plans from the restoration project carried out in 2000. Exhibition materials and other information needed to make up the museum were collected from the relatives of the inmates after due persuasion. In the museum, there is a library containing books written by the prisoners, books covering the political lifetime of Turkey, as well as court protocols. Original graffiti on the inside walls and oil paintings were carefully kept. All the exhibited items are original. The museum also has meeting and conference halls, and has served as a place for cultural activities as well as a film set.

Exhibits
In the entrance of the museum, the Ninth and Tenth Ward are situated, which were metaphorically called "Hilton Ward" because of their smaller size in relation to the other prison wards and, therefore, relative comfort. Prominent politicians like Bülent Ecevit and Osman Bölükbaşı were interned in these wards, where their biographies are shown on the bunk beds.

Isolation cells were reserved for high-profile criminals. Yelling of wardens and horrible screams of tortured prisoners in the isolation cells sound out of the loudspeakers while walking in the hallways. Clanging historic türkü (folk songs) and poems are heard reminding visitors of the era of tortures and executions.

In the isolation cells and the Fourth Ward, there are twenty-two wax sculptures depicting inmates in different positions in their daily prison life. On the bunk beds of the Fifth Ward, biographies of notable inmates are attached. The Sixth Ward incorporates, in addition to more biographies, personal belongings of notable inmates such as watches, cigarettes, walking sticks, dishes, glasses, teapot and such other personal articles.

In the grand yard, the Turkish bath for the prisoners is situated. Photographs of notable inmates hang on the branches of a wish tree in the yard. There is also an original gallows in the yard with the original hangman's knot hanging on it. Nineteen executions took place there.

Upon request, a special segregation unit was constructed over the existing isolation cells. For an additional payment, visitors can be locked in this unit for fifteen minutes or one hour to better perceive the prison conditions. To experience this, they enter the cell escorted by a warden after turning over their watch and cellphone, and getting handcuffed. These visitors are not permitted to leave the cell before their time is up.

In popular culture
 Yılmaz Güney was inspired from Ulucanlar Prison in his 1983 film Duvar.
 The 1989 film Uçurtmayı Vurmasınlar, starring Nur Sürer as a female political prisoner, was shot in the prison.

References

Museums in Altındağ, Ankara
Prison museums in Asia
Museums established in 2011
2011 establishments in Turkey
Government buildings completed in 1923
1925 establishments in Turkey
2006 disestablishments in Turkey
Defunct prisons in Turkey
Execution sites